Di Ba't Ikaw (International title: Love and Revenge / ) is a 1999 Philippine television drama romance series broadcast by GMA Network. Directed by Maryo J. de los Reyes, it stars Jessa Zaragoza, Angelika dela Cruz, Jao Mapa and Jomari Yllana. It premiered on May 17, 1999 on the network's Telebabad line up replacing Del Tierro. The series concluded on October 29, 1999 with a total of 120 episodes.

Cast and characters
Lead cast
 Jessa Zaragoza as Hasmin Cardenas
 Jao Mapa as Victor "Junie" Montecillo Jr.
 Jomari Yllana as Paolo Montecillo

Supporting cast
 Romeo Vasquez as Victor Montecillo
 Pilar Pilapil as Amelia Montecillo
 Edu Manzano as Guiller
 Ciara Sotto as Grace Montecillo
 Angelika Dela Cruz as Eloisa
 Daria Ramirez as Saling
 Julio Diaz as Domeng Cardenas
 Ali Sotto / Jean Saburit as Karina Latada
 Gabby Eigenmann as Alexander "Alex" Montecillo
 Jake Roxas as Berting

Guest cast
 Matthew Mendoza as Dave
 Trina Zuñiga as Celia
 Melissa Mendez as Helen
 Maricar de Mesa as Carla
 Jackie de Guzman as Anita
 Francis Ricafort as Alvin
 Spanky Manikan as Celia's father
 Xaxa Manalo as Celia's friend

References

External links
 

1999 Philippine television series debuts
1999 Philippine television series endings
Filipino-language television shows
GMA Network drama series
Philippine romance television series
Television shows set in the Philippines